The Lisitsyn family was a family of metalworkers and businessmen, and the first documented manufacturers of Samovars, living in the city of Tula in the Empire of Russia, during the 18th and 19th centuries.

Notable members 

Fyodor Ivanovich Lisitsyn was a progenitor of the dynasty, a weapons-maker and metalworker at his own brass factory in Tula.

Ivan Fyodorovich Lisitsyn and Nazar Fyodorovich Lisitsyn were the two sons of Fyodor Lisitsyn. From their childhood they were engaged in metalworking at their family's factory. In 1778 they made a samovar, and the same year Nazar Lisitsyn registered the first samovar-making factory in Russia. They may not have been the inventors of samovar, but they were the first historically recorded and documented samovar-makers, and their various and beautiful samovar designs became very influential throughout the later history of samovar-making.

Nikita Nazarovich Lisitsyn was a son of Nazar Lisitsyn who inherited the samovar factory in 1823. That year they produced 423 samovars. Ten years later the production was about 625 samovars a year, but by 1853 it had fallen to 315.

Nikita Nikitich Lisitsyn was a son of Nikita Nazarovich Lisitsyn and the next owner of Lisitsyn factory. He had a great success with his samovars at the pan-Russia Fair in Nizhny Novgorod and managed to sell much of the production to Bukhara and Khiva in Central Asia, where sphere-shaped samovars had become popular. In 1856 Nikita Lisitsyn received a medal and a kaftan in recognition of the quality of his samovars. In 1863 Lisitsyn participated in an exhibition, organised on the arrival of a son of Alexander II of Russia to Tula. After that time the history of the Lisitsyn family is unknown.

References 
 Самовары Лисицыных / Samovars of Lisitsyns at the site of Sloboda, a Tula-based newspaper

See also
Samovar

Russian inventors
Russian families